Kiss Yr Frenemies is the debut album by the American indie rock band Illuminati Hotties. The album was released on May 11, 2018, under the Tiny Engines label.

Background
After attending the Berklee College of Music, Sarah Tudzin, the bandleader of Illuminati Hotties, moved back to Los Angeles to and worked as an audio engineer for Slowdive, Porches and Hamilton. Rolling Stone reported that Sarah Tudzin recorded Kiss Yr Frenemies in the studio where she was an assistant to Chris Coady after the working for the aforementioned projects. The album was released on Tiny Engines on May 11, 2018.

Critical reception
Larry Fitzmaurice of Pitchfork gave the album a 7.3/10.

Track listing

References

2018 debut albums
Rock albums by American artists